Drew Ferguson or Andrew Ferguson may refer to:

 Drew Ferguson (politician) (born 1966), American politician; U.S. Representative from Georgia
 Drew Ferguson (soccer) (born 1957), former Canadian soccer player
 Andrew Ferguson (born 1956), American journalist
 Andrew Ferguson (rugby union) (born 1992), Canadian rugby union player
 Andrew Guthrie Ferguson, professor of law
 Andy Ferguson (born 1985), Scottish footballer

See also
 Andrew Ferguson Neil (born 1949), Scottish journalist and broadcaster